The discography of American rapper and singer André 3000 consists of one extended play (EP), one single as a lead artist, and eleven singles as a featured artist, including one promotional single. 

André 3000 embarked on his musical career in 1991, as a member of the Southern hip hop group OutKast, alongside fellow Atlanta-based rapper Big Boi. Together they have recorded and released six studio albums, and their singles "Ms. Jackson", "Hey Ya!" and "The Way You Move", have all topped the US Billboard Hot 100.

Soundtracks

EPs

Singles

As a lead artist

As featured artist

Promotional singles

Other charted songs

Guest appearances

Solo production discography 
Note: Andre also helped produce several songs on OutKast's albums with partner Big Boi, usually credited as just OutKast or as their production alias Earthtone III.

2003
Big Gipp – Mutant Mindframe
 07. "Boogie Man" (featuring André 3000)

Kelis – Tasty
 08. "Millionaire" (featuring André 3000)

Killer Mike – Monster
 03. "Akshon (Yeah!)" (featuring Outkast)
 15. "Re-Akshon" (featuring Bone Crusher, T.I., and Bun B)

2004
Gwen Stefani – Love. Angel. Music. Baby.
 05. "Bubble Pop Electric" (featuring Johnny Vulture)
 12. "Long Way to Go" (featuring André 3000)

2010
Big Boi – Sir Lucious Left Foot: The Son of Chico Dusty
 08. "You Ain't No DJ" (featuring Yelawolf)

2014
Aretha Franklin – Aretha Franklin Sings the Great Diva Classics
 10. "Nothing Compares 2 U"

2016
Frank Ocean — Blonde
 10. "Solo (Reprise)"

2018
Kids See Ghosts – Kids See Ghosts
 2. "Fire" (produced with Kanye West, BoogzDaBeast and Kid Cudi)

See also 
Outkast discography

Notes

References

External links
 
 
 

Discographies of American artists
Hip hop discographies
 
 
Production discographies